The 2012 Marion Blue Racers season was the 2nd season for the United Indoor Football League (UIFL) franchise.

On July 5, 2011, the Blue Racers announced they were leaving the CIFL to join the Ultimate Indoor Football League.  The Blue Racers were added as a member of the Northern Conference, re-uniting with, their arch-rivals, the Cincinnati Commandos. On August 17, 2011, Lorenzo Styles was named the 3rd head coach in franchise history. In February, team CEO and General Manager, LaMonte Coleman, took a coaching position with the Pittsburgh Power of the Arena Football League. The following day, Ryan Sawyer was named the team's interim general manager while Coleman was coaching in Pittsburgh. On March 30, 2012, Styles resigned as the head coach of the Blue Racers after compiling a 3-1 record, citing personal reason as the reason for his resignation. Offensive Coordinator Marc Huddleston, took over as the team's head coach. The team remained a strong pipeline for the Pittsburgh Power, as both the team's kickers, Trey Kramer and Seth Burkholder, signed with the team. The Blue Racers finished the season with a 7–4 record, earning the 3rd seed in the UIFL North playoff. The team traveled to play the second seeded Erie Explosion, where the game was played at a high school field, where the team had built walls for the playing field. It is the first time an indoor football game, has been played outdoors. The Explosion went on to defeat the Blue Racers 56–47, after the Blue Racers had led 22–0 early in the game.

Schedule
Key:

Regular season

Postseason

Standings

y - clinched regular-season title
x - clinched playoff spot

Final roster

References

Marion Blue Racers
Marion Blue Racers
Marion Blue Racers